is a Japanese manga series written and illustrated by Mayu Murata. It has been serialized in Shueisha's shōjo manga magazine Ribon since December 2015, with its chapters collected into twenty one tankōbon volumes as of July 2022. A live action film adaptation was released in July 2021.

As of November 2022, the series had over 10 million copies in circulation.

Plot
Quiet, shy Uka Ishimori has been nicknamed "stone" since middle school. Upon entering high school, she meets a boy named Kai Miura, whose appearance and personality reminds her of honey lemon soda. As the two become acquainted with one another, Uka's relationship with Kai inspires her to become more confident.

Media

Manga
As of July 2022, twenty one tankōbon volumes have been released.

In July 2022, Yen Press announced that they licensed the series for English publication.

Volume list

Live-action film
In September 2020, it was announced that series is getting a live action film adaptation, starring Snow Man member Raul as Kai Miura and Ai Yoshikawa as Uka Ishimori. The film was directed by Kōji Shintoku, based on a screenplay by Nami Kikkawa. It premiered in Japan on July 9, 2021. The film's theme song is "Hello Hello" by Snow Man.

Reception
As of November 2022, Honey Lemon Soda had over 10 million copies in circulation.

In 2021, the series was nominated at the 45th Kodansha Manga Awards in the shōjo category. It also ranked 40th in Da Vinci magazine's "Book of the Year" list for that year.

References

External links
  
 

Japanese romance films
Live-action films based on manga
Manga adapted into films
Romance anime and manga
Shōjo manga
Shueisha manga
Yen Press titles